Shelley Jane Penn  (born 1965) is a Melbourne-based award-winning architect, educator, urbanist and built environment advocate.

Education
Penn was educated at Kilvington girls grammar and completed her architectural training at Melbourne University in 1988, graduating with honours. She is also a graduate of the Australian Institute of Company Directors (AICD) course.

Professional career

Practice

In 1993, Penn established the firm Shelley Penn Architects as a hybrid practice initially specialising in residential design and shifting focus to include consultation to government and the private sector on public projects from 1999. Her work has been awarded and exhibited nationally and internationally.

Government
Penn has held several positions within state and federal government and in 2014 was recognised as a leading figure in Public Policy within the top 100 Women of Influence by the Australian Financial Review and Westpac Bank. In 2006, she became the first Associate Victorian Government Architect, and a member and then Chair of the National Capital Authority from 2009 to 2014 and the deputy chair of the Heritage Council of Victoria from 2008 to 2012. She has undertaken numerous consultancies as a strategic advisor and reviewer, including conducting major reviews for government including co-chairing the 2011 Barangaroo Review. She has served on multiple Victorian, South Australian and New South Wales local and state government Design Review Panels for projects of all scales.

Professional advocacy
Penn is an active member of the architecture industry's peak body, the Australian Institute of Architects, including having held numerous positions on local and national committees and task forces. After a two-year term as an elected member and Honorary Secretary of the Australian Institute of Architects National Council, in May 2012 Penn was elected as the council's 73rd National President. She was only the third woman elected to the role after Louise Cox in 1994 and Melinda Dodson in 2009. Her election as president was particularly notable given that only a small group of sole practitioners are elected to the volunteer role despite more than half of the institute's members identifying as sole practitioners. She is a Life Fellow of the institute.

In addition to advocacy through representation, Penn is an active contributor to professional discourse. She has been a panellist in numerous public debates, published in many leading professional journals, including Architecture Australia, Architecture and Design, Monument and Artichoke, and is a regular contributor for Parlour; an online forum for the advocacy of women and equity in architecture.

Educator

Penn is currently an adjunct professor in Architectural Practice at Monash University and associate professor in Architecture at University of Melbourne's Melbourne School of Design. She has also taught, co-ordinated and guest critiqued Bachelor and Masters students at Monash, RMIT, Deakin and Melbourne University, since her own graduation in 1988.

Awards and recognition 
In the 2021 Queen's Birthday Honours Penn was appointed a Member of the Order of Australia for "significant service to architecture and design in the public realm, and to professional institutes".

Selected appointments
 2019 - Jury, TAS Chapter Awards, Australian Institute of Architects
2017-: Monash University Architect
2017- : Non-executive Director, Australian Centre for Contemporary Art
2017- : Panel Member, State Design Review Panel, NSW
2012-: Advisory Panel Member, Women's Property Initiative
2012-2016 : Panel member, Capital City Design Review Panel, Adelaide
2016-2018: Council member, Melbourne High School
 2012– : Panel Member, Victorian Design Review Panel
 2014–2016: Council Member, Williamstown High School
 2009–2014 Member then chair, National Capital Authority
 2012–2014: Chair, Architecture Advisory Board, Faculty of Architecture, University of Melbourne
 2012–2013: National President, Australian Institute of Architects
 2013: Jury Chair, National Architecture Awards, Australian Institute of Architects
 2011–2012: Board Member, Architecture Media
 2008–2012: Deputy Chair, Heritage Council of Victoria
 2009–2012: Board Member, Linking Melbourne Authority
 2009–2012: Honorary Secretary, Australian Institute of Architects
 2012: Chair of Juries, Victorian Chapter Awards, Australian Institute of Architects
 2011: Jury Chair, ACT Chapter Awards, Australian Institute of Architects
 2006–2010: Associate Victorian Government Architect, Office of the Victorian Government Architect
 2010 Chair, Premier's Design Awards, State of Design Victoria
 2006–2009: Board Member, Architects Registration Board of Victoria
 2002–2004: Member, Victorian Design Advisory Council
 2000–2001: Design Director, Office of the NSW Government Architect

Work (built)
 Richmond Warehouse, Melbourne (Awarded the Residential Alterations and Extensions Award of Merit at the 2000 Royal Institute of Architects Victorian Awards)
 Fitzroy Terrace, Melbourne
 Institute of Postcolonial Studies, Melbourne
 Overcliffe House, Potts Point, in collaboration with Clinton Murray Architects (Awarded the Residential Architecture Award at the 2002 Royal Institute of Architects NSW Awards)
 Eastern Beach house, Port Fairy, in collaboration with Clinton Murray Architect (Finalist, Best Residential Design, 2008 Timber Design Awards)

Work (public discourse)
 "Gender Salary Gap Not So Great", ArchitectureAU, 13 February 2013
 "Women in Architecture", ArchitectureAU, 3 July 2012 
 "Fitzroy Community School Creative Space", Architecture Australia, (September 2011)
 "Habitat 21", Architecture Australia, (May 2011)
 "Housing in Victoria", Architecture Australia (March/April 2007)
 "Why architecture matters", Architecture Australia (January/February 2007)
 "Urban Parasite", Monument, (December 2002/January 2003)

References

External links
 Shelley Penn Architects practice website
 People: Shelley Penn, profile on the Office of the Victorian Government Architect website
 "Shelley Penn profile", profile by Bluescope Steel Profile Magazine
 People: Shelley Penn, profile on the Wheeler Centre website
 "Build Life Skills First", an interview with Shelley Penn on the Financial Review website
 "Introducing Shelley Penn (Part 1)", an interview with Shelley Penn on ArchiTel
 "Introducing Shelley Penn (Part 2)" an interview with Shelley Penn on ArchiTel
 "Shelley Penn" in Clark, Justine; Davidge, Tania; De Guia, Elyica; Jeffery, Anna; Wilson, Bernadette eds (January 2013). "The Women of Victorian Architecture". Architect Victoria: 6–7. http://www.architecture.com.au/docs/default-source/vic-chapter-publications/summer.pdf

Living people
1965 births
Members of the Order of Australia
Australian women architects
Architects from Melbourne
Architects in government
21st-century Australian architects
20th-century Australian architects
20th-century Australian women
21st-century Australian women
Australian architecture writers